SS John Randolph was a Liberty ship built in the United States during World War II. She was named after John Randolph, was a planter and a Congressman from Virginia, serving in the House of Representatives at various times between 1799 and 1833, and the Senate from 1825 to 1827. He was also Minister to Russia under President Andrew Jackson in 1830.

Construction
John Randolph was laid down on 15 July 1941, under a Maritime Commission (MARCOM) contract, MCE hull 19, by the Bethlehem-Fairfield Shipyard, Baltimore, Maryland; and was launched on 30 December 1941.

History
She was allocated to Union Sulphur & Oil Co., Inc., on 27 February 1942.

Sinking

John Randolph was severely damaged after striking an Allied mine on the night of 5 July 1942.

Having left Murmansk, on 27 June 1942, Convoy QP-13 encountered fog on 5 July 1942, north west of Iceland. At 22:00 Niger mistook what was later identified as an iceberg for Iceland's North Cape, at a bearing of 150° and one mile range. Cubison ordered the convoy to change course to  270°. At 22:40 Niger exploded and sank with a heavy loss of life, this included Commander Cubison. The forepart was salved but broke tow on 1 September 1952 and was wrecked at Torrisdale Bay, Sutherland, Scotland, on 5 September.

References

Bibliography

 
 
 
 
 

 

Liberty ships
Ships built in Baltimore
1941 ships
Ships sunk by mines